In Greek mythology, Termerus (Ancient Greek: Τέρμερος) was a bandit who was killed by Heracles.

Mythology 
The episode is referenced in Plutarch's Life of Theseus, in description of Theseus' method of slaying his assailants by returning "the same sort of violence that they offered to him," as Heracles killed Termerus by “breaking his skull in pieces (whence, they say, comes the proverb of 'a Termerian mischief'), for it seems Termerus killed passengers that he met by running with his head against them.” 

According to Stephanus of Byzantium, Termerus was the eponym of the city Termera in Lycia. A scholiast on Euripides relates that Termera was founded by Termerus and took its name after him. The same source informs that Termerus and Lycus, two Lelegians "of beastly nature", were said to be notorious robbers that raided Caria and also sailed as far as the island Kos for the same purpose; the saying "Termerian mischief" was accordingly inspired by their deeds.

According to the dictionary Suda, however, the proverbial expression "Termerian mischief" was due to a fortified dungeon located in Caria near Mount Termerion lying between Myndus and Halicarnassus.

Notes

References 
Lucius Mestrius Plutarchus, Lives with an English Translation by Bernadotte Perrin. Cambridge, MA. Harvard University Press. London. William Heinemann Ltd. 1914. 1. Online version at the Perseus Digital Library. Greek text available from the same website.
Plutarch. Lives of the Noble Grecians and Romans. New York: Modern Library, 1979. Print.
Stephanus of Byzantium, Stephani Byzantii Ethnicorum quae supersunt, edited by August Meineike (1790-1870), published 1849. A few entries from this important ancient handbook of place names have been translated by Brady Kiesling. Online version at the Topos Text Project.
Suida, Suda Encyclopedia translated by David Whitehead. Online version at the Topos Text Project.

Greek mythology of Anatolia
Mythology of Heracles